Leonard Nelson Hubbard (1958/1959 – December 16, 2021), also known simply as Hub, was an American musician who was best known for being the bass guitarist for The Roots, a Philadelphia band, from 1992 to 2007. He played on all of their records until his departure from the group, including 1999's Things Fall Apart and 2004's The Tipping Point. He was known for always having a chew stick in his mouth, both on and off the stage. Hubbard studied at Settlement Music School during his youth in Philadelphia, then went on to study classical upright bass at Carnegie Mellon University in Pittsburgh, Pennsylvania.

Hub played his last show with The Roots on June 7, 2008, at the first annual Roots Picnic.

Hub lived in West Philadelphia. He was diagnosed with multiple myeloma in 2007, and died from the disease at Lankenau Medical Center in Lower Merion Township, Pennsylvania, on December 16, 2021, at the age of 62. He was interred at Laurel Hill Cemetery in Philadelphia.

References

External links
 
 

1950s births
2021 deaths
20th-century American bass guitarists
21st-century American bass guitarists
American male bass guitarists
American male guitarists
Burials at Laurel Hill Cemetery (Philadelphia)
Carnegie Mellon University College of Fine Arts alumni
Deaths from cancer in Pennsylvania
Deaths from multiple myeloma
Guitarists from Philadelphia
The Roots members